Representatives of the President of Ukraine are five chief offices that are directed by a presidential representative. Given that the President of Ukraine is head of state, the President faces the need to represent his/her interests in different political and judicial bodies of power in the country.

List of representatives

 the Presidential representative of Ukraine in Crimea 
 the Constitutional Court of Ukraine
 the Verkhovna Rada (parliament)
 the Cabinet of Ministers of Ukraine
 the Chernobyl Nuclear Power Plant

Notes

References

Presidency of Ukraine